The 57th Norwegian Biathlon Championships were held in Sirdal, Vest-Agder, Norway from 25 March to 29 March 2015 at the stadium Feed skiarena, arranged by Tonstad IL. There were a total of 8 scheduled competitions: sprint, individual, and relay races for men and women; and a pursuit for the women and a mass start for the men. A pursuit race after the sprint race was scheduled for the men, but that was changed to a mass start race with 60 participants so as to include some of the elite team that had been delayed by the weather and so had been unable to compete in the sprint race. Among these were Emil Hegle Svendsen and Tarjei Bø.

Ole Einar Bjørndalen did not participate in any races due to a cold he had picked up in the last round of the World Cup in Khanty-Mansiysk.

Schedule
All times are local (UTC+1).

Medal winners

Men

Women

References

External links
  

Norwegian Biathlon Championships
2015 in biathlon
2015 in Norwegian sport